Sajid Kamran Khan (born 23 November 1970) is an Indian film director, television presenter, comedian and an actor who works in the Bollywood film industry. He is the brother of choreographer Farah Khan. He is best known for the Housefull film series, Heyy Babyy (2007), Himmatwala (2013) and Humshakals (2014). Khan also served as a judge on the Indian reality television show Nach Baliye.

Early life 
Sajid Khan was born in Mumbai, Maharashtra, the son of former actor Kamran Khan and his wife Menaka Khan (née Irani). He has one sister, Farah Khan, who is a choreographer, director, producer and actor. Farah is married to Shirish Kunder, also a producer, editor and director of films. Khan has other connections to the film industry: former actresses Honey Irani and Daisy Irani are his mother's sisters and filmmakers Farhan Akhtar and Zoya Akhtar are his maternal cousins.

Khan completed his primary education from Maneckji Cooper School in Mumbai and then graduated from Mithibai College. At age 16, while still a college student, he started DJing at various parties and social events.

Career 
Khan began his career as a host of the TV show Main Bhi Detective in 1995.

He then hosted a music countdown show Ikke Pe Ikka in 1996. The show entered the Limca Book of Records as the longest running countdown show to be aired on Indian television with the same host.

In Kehne Mein Kya Harz Hai he played triple roles; the show made 200 episodes which were aired from 1997 to 2001.

He also did a stand-up comedy show Sajid No. 1 in the late 1990s. His next show was Super Sale in 2005. In 2008, he hosted a talk show, Sajid's Superstars and also judged India's Got Talent season 2.

Along with Terrence Lewis and Shilpa Shetty, Khan was a judge on Nach Baliye Season 5 (2012–2013) and Season 6(2013-2014).

Khan started his directorial career with the movie Darna Zaroori Hai (2006), which had six short stories, in which he directed one story – the story about a man going to watch a movie passing through a graveyard (starring Manoj Pahwa and Sarita Joshi) called The Graveyard. He then directed Heyy Babyy (2007), his first full-length effort. This was followed by Housefull (2010) and Housefull 2 (2012); all three were successful. But after these three hits, he directed two films were box office failure. The first was Himmatwala (2013), a critical and commercial failure, one of the worst Bollywood movie and a remake of the 1983 movie Himmatwala. His next directorial venture was  Humshakals (2014), which is generally ranked amongst the worst Indian films of all time by critics. All the five movies he directed alone started with H.

Khan acted in the movie Jhooth Bole Kauwa Kaate (1998). He also made a brief appearance in Main Hoon Na (2004), Mujhse Shaadi Karogi (2004) and Happy New Year (2014).

His last project (as a screenwriter) was Housefull 4 (2019), and he has since taken a break from filmmaking being vexed by sexual harassment accusations. His comeback project is as a director of a yet to be titled film.

Since October 2022, he participated in the Colors TV's reality show Bigg Boss 16. He walked out of the show on day 106 due to professional commitments.

Personal life
While filming Housefull 2 in 2011, Khan began a romantic relationship with actress Jacqueline Fernandez. The relationship attracted media coverage in India and there was speculation of an impending wedding. However, the relationship ended in May 2013.

Allegations of sexual harassment
In the wake of the MeToo movement in India, since October 2018, Sajid has been accused of sexual harassment by several female colleagues. Women who have accused Khan of sexual harassment include Mandana Karimi, Saloni Chopra, Rachel White, Simran Suri, Marina Kuwar, Aahana Kumra, Dimple Paula, Sherlyn Chopra, and journalist Karishma Upadhyay. The BBC television documentary Death in Bollywood (2021), which covers the suicide of Indian actress Jiah Khan, also included accusations of harassment against Khan on Jiah by her sister Karishma Khan.

The Indian Film and Television Directors’ Association imposed a ban on Khan from directing films in light of the allegations. It was subsequently revoked a year later on 10 December 2019.

Though he denied the allegations, Khan stepped down as the director of Housefull 4 (2019) and was eventually replaced by Farhad Samji, the co-director of Housefull 3 (2016).

Filmography

As actor

Television

References

External links 

 

Living people
Indian male television actors
Male actors from Mumbai
Age controversies
Indian male screenwriters
Hindi-language film directors
1970 births
Film directors from Mumbai
21st-century Indian film directors